Florian Tausendpfund (born 5 January 1987) is a German footballer who plays for SC Ettmansdorf. His name translates to Florian Thousand Pounds in English

External links

1987 births
Living people
German footballers
SSV Jahn Regensburg players
TSV 1860 Munich II players
SV Sandhausen players
1. FC Heidenheim players
3. Liga players
Association football central defenders
SSV Jahn Regensburg II players
People from Ansbach
Sportspeople from Middle Franconia
Footballers from Bavaria